The Diana monkey (Cercopithecus diana) is an Old World monkey found in the high canopy forests in Sierra Leone, Liberia, and western Côte d’Ivoire. Named for its white brow which is said to resemble the bow of the Roman goddess Diana, this black-grey guenon has a white throat, crescent-shaped browband, ruff and beard.

Taxonomy
Two taxa formerly considered subspecies of the Diana monkey have recently been elevated to full species status: the roloway monkey (C. roloway) is found in Côte d'Ivoire and Ghana, and the Dryas monkey (C. dryas) found in the DR Congo.

Distribution
This species can be found in West Africa, from Sierra Leone to Côte d'Ivoire.

Habitat 
The Diana monkey is found in the primary forests, and does not thrive in secondary forests.  The species is regarded as endangered by the IUCN as well as by the United States Fish and Wildlife Service, the chief dangers to them being habitat destruction (they are now virtually confined to coastal areas) and hunting for bushmeat.

Description
The Diana monkey ranges from 40 to 55 cm in length, excluding its tail, which is of a uniform 3–4 cm diameter and 50–75 cm long. Adults weigh between 4–7 kg.

They are generally black or dark grey, but have a white throat, crescent-shaped browband, ruff and beard; the browband gave the species its common name, since it was held to resemble the crescent on the brow of the goddess Diana. The monkeys' underarms are also white, and they have a white stripe down their thighs, while the backs of their thighs, and their lower backs, are a chestnut colour. Apart from the browband, ruff and beard, and some fringes on their limbs, their fur is rough and tough.

Biology and behavior
Individual Diana monkeys may live for up to 20 years. This monkey is active during the day. It feeds at all levels of the canopy, and rarely comes down to the ground. Diana monkeys retreat to the upper levels of the trees at night, though they do not make nests. They feed mainly on fruit and insects, but also take flowers, young leaves, and invertebrates, and are in turn preyed on by the crowned hawk-eagle, the leopard, the common chimpanzee, and humans.

The Diana monkey is a noisy presence in the forest. Its marked coloration allows a wide range of visual social signals. Female Diana monkeys produce specific alarm calls, alert calls and contact calls depending on the differences in predator fauna, suggesting that the flexibility of female calls are better than that of males.  

Other forest residents such as the yellow-casqued hornbill are able to discriminate these and take appropriate action.

Diana Monkeys communicate both to local group members and distant competitors with different kind of alarm sounds. Diana Monkeys produce loud noises to make other monkeys aware of leopards or other competitors in their area. 

Groups consist of a single male with a number of reproducing females and their infants. In good conditions, adult females reproduce annually. Gestation lasts about 5 months, and the young nurse for a further 6 months. Normally, only a single infant is born. Although the young are born in a fairly well-developed condition, with open eyes and able to grasp their mothers, at least in zoo conditions, Diana monkey mothers appear anxious and possessive, rarely letting young infants leave them. As infants grow, however, they become very playful. Juveniles reach sexual maturity at an age of about 3 years. Daughters remain in their mothers' social groups, while males leave their natal groups shortly before attaining sexual maturity.

Human relevance
Like most primates, Diana monkeys can carry diseases that can be communicated to humans, like yellow fever and tuberculosis. Native tribes in the tropical forest of West Africa poach Diana monkeys, which are sold as luxury meat and seen as a commodity.

Gallery

References

External links 

 

Diana monkey
Mammals of West Africa
Diana monkey
Diana monkey
Articles containing video clips